Euceromasia is a genus of flies in the family Tachinidae.

Species
E. floridensis Reinhard, 1957
E. neptis Reinhard, 1947
E. sobrina Reinhard, 1974
E. solata Reinhard, 1947
E. spinosa Townsend, 1912

References

Diptera of North America
Exoristinae
Tachinidae genera
Taxa named by Charles Henry Tyler Townsend